This is a list of television films produced for American Broadcasting Company (ABC). Many of these films were made as television pilots, four of them were United Nations television film series.

1950s
 Portrait of Gina (1958)
 Girl on the Run (October 10, 1958)

1960s

1970s

1970

1971

1972

1973
{| class="wikitable plainrowheaders sortable" style="width:50%;text-align:center;"
! scope="col" style="width:40%;" | Title !! scope="col" style="width:14%;" | Premiere date
|-
| scope="row" style="text-align:left;" | Firehouse || January 2, 1973
|-
| scope="row" style="text-align:left;" | Luvcast U.S.A. || January 6, 1973
|-
| scope="row" style="text-align:left;" | The Devil's Daughter || January 9, 1973
|-
| scope="row" style="text-align:left;" | That Girl in Wonderland || January 13, 1973
|-
| scope="row" style="text-align:left;" | Trouble Comes to Town || January 10, 1973
|-
| scope="row" style="text-align:left;" | The Night Strangler || January 16, 1973
|-
| scope="row" style="text-align:left;" | Frankenstein || January 16, 1973
|-
| scope="row" style="text-align:left;" | Female Artillery || January 17, 1973
|-
| scope="row" style="text-align:left;" | Go Ask Alice || January 24, 1973
|-
| scope="row" style="text-align:left;" | A Cold Night's Death || January 30, 1973
|-
| scope="row" style="text-align:left;" | Snatched || January 31, 1973
|-
| scope="row" style="text-align:left;" | Divorce His, Divorce Hers || February 6-7, 1973
|-
| scope="row" style="text-align:left;" | The Great American Beauty Contest || February 13, 1973
|-
| scope="row" style="text-align:left;" | The Girls of Huntington House || February 14, 1973
|-
| scope="row" style="text-align:left;" | A Brand New Life || February 20, 1973
|-
| scope="row" style="text-align:left;" | And No One Could Save Her || February 21, 1973
|-
| scope="row" style="text-align:left;" | The Connection || February 23, 1973
|-
| scope="row" style="text-align:left;" | You'll Never See Me Again || February 28, 1973
|-
| scope="row" style="text-align:left;" | The Letters || March 6, 1973
|-
| scope="row" style="text-align:left;" | The Six Million Dollar Man || March 7, 1973
|-
| scope="row" style="text-align:left;" | The Bait || March 13, 1973
|-
| scope="row" style="text-align:left;" | Class of '63 || March 14, 1973
|-
| scope="row" style="text-align:left;" | Beg, Borrow or Steal || March 20, 1973
|-
| scope="row" style="text-align:left;" | Toma || March 21, 1973
|-
| scope="row" style="text-align:left;" | The Gift of Terror || April 5, 1973
|-
| scope="row" style="text-align:left;" | The Picture of Dorian Gray || April 23, 1973
|-
| scope="row" style="text-align:left;" | The Man Without a Country || April 24, 1973
|-
| scope="row" style="text-align:left;" | Lost in Space	|| September 8, 1973
|-
| scope="row" style="text-align:left;" | Deliver Us From Evil || September 11, 1973
|-
| scope="row" style="text-align:left;" | She Lives! || September 12, 1973
|-
| scope="row" style="text-align:left;" | Dying Room Only || September 18, 1973
|-
| scope="row" style="text-align:left;" | Satan's School for Girls || September 19, 1973
|-
| scope="row" style="text-align:left;" | Smile When You Say 'I Do''' || September 25, 1973
|-
| scope="row" style="text-align:left;" | Hijack || September 26, 1973
|-
| scope="row" style="text-align:left;" | Runaway! || September 29, 1973
|-
| scope="row" style="text-align:left;" | Isn't It Shocking? ||October 2, 1973
|-
| scope="row" style="text-align:left;" | Letters from Three Lovers || October 3, 1973
|-
| scope="row" style="text-align:left;" | The Alpha Caper || October 6, 1973
|-
| scope="row" style="text-align:left;" | The Merchant of Venice || October 7, 1973
|-
| scope="row" style="text-align:left;" | Shirts/Skins || October 9, 1973
|-
| scope="row" style="text-align:left;" | Don't Be Afraid of the Dark || October 10, 1973
|-
| scope="row" style="text-align:left;" | Double Indemnity ||October 13, 1973
|-
| scope="row" style="text-align:left;" | The Third Girl from the Left || October 16, 1973
|-
| scope="row" style="text-align:left;" | The Man Who Could Talk to Kids || October 17, 1973
|-
| scope="row" style="text-align:left;" | The Six Million Dollar Man: Wine, Women, and War || October 20, 1973
|-
| scope="row" style="text-align:left;" | The President's Plane Is Missing || October 23, 1973
|-
| scope="row" style="text-align:left;" | The Mini-Munsters || October 27, 1973
|-
| scope="row" style="text-align:left;" | Money to Burn || October 27, 1973
|-
| scope="row" style="text-align:left;" | Ordeal || October 30, 1973
|-
| scope="row" style="text-align:left;" | Guess Who's Sleeping in My Bed? || October 31, 1973
|-
| scope="row" style="text-align:left;" | Linda || November 3, 1973
|-
| scope="row" style="text-align:left;" | The Girl Most Likely To... || November 6, 1973
|-
| scope="row" style="text-align:left;" | My Darling Daughters' Anniversary || November 7, 1973
|-
| scope="row" style="text-align:left;" | The Death Race || November 10, 1973
|-
| scope="row" style="text-align:left;" | Trapped || November 14, 1973
|-
| scope="row" style="text-align:left;" | Nanny and the Professor and the Phantom of the Circus || November 17, 1973
|-
| scope="row" style="text-align:left;" | The Six Million Dollar Man: The Solid Gold Kidnapping || November 17, 1973
|-
| scope="row" style="text-align:left;" | The Affair || November 20, 1973
|-
| scope="row" style="text-align:left;" | Scream, Pretty Peggy || November 24, 1973
|-
| scope="row" style="text-align:left;" | Cry Rape! || November 27, 1973
|-
| scope="row" style="text-align:left;" | Outrage || November 28, 1973
|-
| scope="row" style="text-align:left;" | A Summer Without Boys || December 4, 1973
|-
| scope="row" style="text-align:left;" | Blood Sport || December 5, 1973
|-
| scope="row" style="text-align:left;" | Maneater || December 8, 1973
|-
| scope="row" style="text-align:left;" | The Cat Creature || December 11, 1973
|-
| scope="row" style="text-align:left;" | Message to My Daughter || December 12, 1973
|-
| scope="row" style="text-align:left;" | The Glass Menagerie || December 16, 1973
|-
| scope="row" style="text-align:left;" | What Are Best Friends For? || December 18, 1973
|-
| scope="row" style="text-align:left;" | Pioneer Woman || December 19, 1973
|-
| scope="row" style="text-align:left;" | A Dream for Christmas || December 24, 1973
|}

1974

1975

1976

1977

1978

1979

1980s

1980

1981

1982

1983

1984

1985

1986

1987

1988

1989

1990s

1990

1991

1992

1993

1994

1995

1996

1997

1998

1999

2000s

2000

2001

 Inside the Osmonds (February 5, 2001)
 These Old Broads (February 12, 2001)
 Life with Judy Garland: Me and My Shadows (February 25 – 26, 2001)
 Amy & Isabelle (March 4, 2001)
 Princess of Thieves (March 11, 2001)
 Columbo: Murder with Too Many Notes (March 12, 2001)
 South Pacific (March 26, 2001)
 Final Jeopardy (April 9, 2001)
 When Billie Beat Bobby (April 16, 2001)
 Ladies and the Champ (April 22, 2001)
 Kiss My Act (2001)
 Child Star: The Shirley Temple Story (May 13, 2001)
 Anne Frank: The Whole Story (May 20 – 21, 2001)
 Walt: The Man Behind the Myth (September 16, 2001)
 The Facts of Life Reunion (November 18, 2001)
 Brian's Song (December 2, 2001)

2002

2003
 Then Came Jones (2003)
 The Street Lawyer (2003)
 111 Gramercy Park (2003)
 Sounder (January 19, 2003)
 Columbo: Columbo Likes the Nightlife (January 30, 2003)
 The Music Man (February 16, 2003)
 Eloise at the Plaza (April 27, 2003)
 The Partners (May 1, 2003)
 The Challenge (November 15, 2003)
 The Diary of Ellen Rimbauer (May 12, 2003)
 Phenomenon II (November 1, 2003)
 Eloise at Christmastime (November 22, 2003)

2004

2005

See also
 List of films produced by American Broadcasting Company
 List of production companies owned by the American Broadcasting Company
 American Broadcasting-Paramount Theatres
 Television film
 Disney anthology television series (list of episodes)
 The ABC Sunday Night Movie ABC Movie of the Week The ABC Saturday Superstar Movie ABC Afterschool Special ABC Theater ABC Weekend Special The ABC Mystery Movie (list of  episodes)
 ABC Saturday Movie of the Week''

Television films
American Broadcasting Company
American Broadcasting Company